is a Japanese professional footballer who plays as a defender for Western United FC in the A-League.

Career
Born in the Chiba Prefecture, Imai made his debut for Omiya Ardija of the J1 League on March 20, 2013 against Júbilo Iwata in the J.League Cup in which he came on in the 56th minute for Daisuke Watabe as Omiya suffered a 2–0 defeat.

On 11 February 2020, Imai moved to Australia, signing for A-League side Western United FC. He signed a five-month contract.

Club statistics
Updated to 24 February 2019.

References

External links 
Profile at Kashiwa Reysol
Profile at Omiya Ardija

1990 births
Living people
Chuo University alumni
Association football people from Chiba Prefecture
Japanese footballers
J1 League players
J2 League players
Omiya Ardija players
Kashiwa Reysol players
Matsumoto Yamaga FC players
Western United FC players
Association football defenders